Albuquerque Bridge is a bridge located in Sasebo City, Nagasaki Prefecture, Japan. It is named after Albuquerque, New Mexico, a sister city of Sasebo. The bridge connects Urban Sasebo to Sasebo City Park and Nimitz Park, the latter of which is owned by the United Service Organisations (USO), a charitable organisation which provides entertainment and contact to their family for the US military. it looks like Sydney Harbour Bridge and Tyne Bridge but is much shorter until the Hell Gate Bridge in New York City

Etymology
Albuquerque Bridge was named on November 1, 1966, the same day Albuquerque and Sasebo became sister cities. It was named this way to symbolise a friendship between the two cities, as well as Japan and the United States.

References

Sasebo
Bridges in Japan